Michele Morganella (born 25 April 1986) is an Italian footballer who currently plays as midfielder in Switzerland for FC Chippis.

References

Football CH profile

1986 births
Living people
Italian footballers
Association football midfielders
FC Chiasso players
FC Sion players
FC Le Mont players
FC Stade Nyonnais players
SC Kriens players
FC Martigny-Sports players
Swiss Super League players
Swiss Challenge League players
Swiss Promotion League players
Swiss 1. Liga (football) players
2. Liga Interregional players
Swiss people of Italian descent